Rytidosperma pallidum (syn.  Joycea pallida), commonly known as  red-anther wallaby grass, is an Australian species of tussock grass found in Victoria, New South Wales and the Australian Capital Territory. The grass has flowers in December, and the flowers have a prominent red anther, after which  it is commonly named.

References

pallidum
Bunchgrasses of Australasia
Flora of the Australian Capital Territory
Flora of New South Wales
Poales of Australia